Lamarche is a municipality in Quebec, Canada.

Demographics
Population trend:
 Population in 2021: 476 (2016 to 2021 population change: -7.4%)
 Population in 2016: 514 
 Population in 2011: 557 
 Population in 2006: 562
 Population in 2001: 527
 Population in 1996: 564
 Population in 1991: 562

Private dwellings occupied by usual residents: 255 (total dwellings: 396)

Mother tongue:
 English as first language: 1.8%
 French as first language: 95.6%
 English and French as first language: 0%
 Other as first language: 2.6%

See also
 List of municipalities in Quebec

References

External links

Municipalities in Quebec
Incorporated places in Saguenay–Lac-Saint-Jean